Therdthai Diamond Football Club (Thai สโมสรเทิดไทไดมอนด์), is a Thai football club based in Bangkok, Thailand. The club is currently playing in the Thai Football Division 3.

Record

References
 104 ทีมร่วมชิงชัย! แบโผผลจับสลาก ดิวิชั่น 3 ฤดูกาล 2016

External links
 Facebookpage

Association football clubs established in 2009
Football clubs in Bangkok
Sport in Bangkok
2009 establishments in Thailand